Grantham railway station was a railway station on the Main Line railway in Queensland, Australia. It served the town of Grantham in the Lockyer Valley Region.

Description 
The station building has been removed to the Gatton And District Historical Museum at Gatton in 1996, though the site still houses some sheds and a concrete platform on the northern side of the railway.

References

Disused railway stations in Queensland
Main Line railway, Queensland
Lockyer Valley Region